Carlo Muñoz (born 24 February 1978) is a Filipino-born American actor.

Early life 
Muñoz is the middle child of Louie Muñoz and Patricia García.  Muñoz's older brother is actor Leandro Muñoz. His younger brother Angelo also appeared in some TV shows in the Philippines. His father is a brother of actress Tita Muñoz.

Career 
While in college, Muñoz started working as a commercial model and appeared in local TV ads including Del Monte and Coca-Cola.

In 1996, he joined ABS-CBN's Talent Center and was one of the new actors introduced under Star Circle Batch 6.

Muñoz played the titular character of the "Hello, Billy" advertising campaign by PLDT. The series followed the romance of Billy and Gracia in the United States, revealed through overseas telephone conversations with his nosey mother in the Philippines, and the couple's eventual homecoming and marriage.  The advertising campaign, which later expanded to radio and print, ran between 2000 and 2001.

He has played important roles such as Mark in Pangako Sa'yo an internationally acclaimed Primetime Soap Opera that lasted for two years and as the mute friend of Carol Banawa in the ensemble Primetime series of ABS-CBN Bituin

Personal life 
Muñoz, together with then girlfriend Enid "Meg" Reyes, older brother Leandro and Leandro's daughter Francesca, moved to the United States in 2003 after the death of their father. He married Reyes in a civil wedding in California on Valentine's Day the following year—the couple first met at the set of a Wansapanataym episodetogether they have 3 sons.

Filmography

Television

Film

Awards and nominations

References

External links

American male actors of Filipino descent
Living people
1978 births